Cychrus schmidti is a species of ground beetle in the subfamily of Carabinae. It was described by Maximilien Chaudoir in 1837.

References

schmidti
Beetles described in 1837